David Hogg (born 2000) is an American gun control advocate.

David Hogg may also refer to: 

David Hogg (Irish politician) (1840–1914)
David Hogg (American politician) (1886–1973), former U.S. Representative
Davie Hogg (born 1946), Scottish footballer
David R. Hogg (born 1958), United States Army officer

See also 
David Hoggan